Malcom Chalmers is an Australian Paralympic swimmer. At the 1984 New York/Stoke Mandeville Games, he won a gold medal in the Men's 100 m Freestyle L6 event, a silver medal in the Men's 100 m Butterfly L6 event, and two bronze medals in the Men's 100 m Breaststroke L6 and Men's 200 m Individual Medley L6 events.

References

Male Paralympic swimmers of Australia
Swimmers at the 1984 Summer Paralympics
Medalists at the 1984 Summer Paralympics
Paralympic gold medalists for Australia
Paralympic silver medalists for Australia
Paralympic bronze medalists for Australia
Paralympic medalists in swimming
Australian male freestyle swimmers
Australian male breaststroke swimmers
Australian male butterfly swimmers
Australian male medley swimmers
20th-century Australian people
Year of birth missing (living people)
Living people